Richard Goldsbrough (17 October 1821 – 8 April 1886) was an English-born Australian businessman who was involved in the wool industry in the 19th century.

Goldsbrough took little part in public life, although he was a steward of the Victoria Racing Club from its formation in 1864 until 1886. He was essentially a business man, always abreast of the times. He had played an important role in the development of the wool trade of Australia.

Early life
Goldsbrough was born in Shipley, Yorkshire, the only son of Joshua Goldsbrough, a butcher, and his wife Hannah, née Speight. At 14 years of age Goldsbrough was apprenticed to a Bradford firm and became a wool stapler. Goldsbrough began working for himself in a small way in 1842, purchasing clips and sorting them for the manufacturers. His business was prospering, but feeling that Australia offered him a wider field, he sailed from Liverpool in 1847, leaving his wife in England, and after a short stay at Adelaide went on to Melbourne.

Career in Australia
In Melbourne, in 1848 he bought a weatherboard building on the corner of Williams Street and Flinders Lane and went into business as a classer and packer and as a buyer of wool for sale in England. In 1850 he set up the first regular wool auction in Bourke St, Melbourne. In 1853 he went into partnership with Edward Row and George Kirk under the name of E. Row and Company. He prospered and was able to buy a substantial bluestone warehouse and a second one in 1857 at the corner of Bourke and William Streets. In 1857 he took Hugh Parker into partnership and the business of R. Goldsbrough and Company was established. The building at the corner of Bourke and William Streets was begun in 1862. Other partners were admitted in later years, John Sutcliffe Horsfall, David Parker and Arthur Parker in 1876; and in 1881 the business was amalgamated with the Australasian Agency and Banking Corporation and formed into a public company, R Goldsbrough & Co Ltd, of which Goldsbrough was chairman of directors. In the 1870s Goldsbrough was also associated with Alexander Robertson, John Wagner and Salathiel Booth in several properties.

Death and legacy
Goldsbrough died at Melbourne from an internal tumour on 8 April 1886. He and his wife, Emma Hodgson (1822–1877), probably had three children, all of whom died young in Yorkshire. Goldsbrough died without a surviving wife or children. In 1888, his partners merged with the Sydney firm of Mort & Co to form Goldsbrough Mort & Co Ltd.  In 1963, the firm merged again to form Elder Smith Goldsbrough Mort Ltd which traded under that name until 1982.  The present day business is Elders Limited.

See also
Thomas Sutcliffe Mort

References

1821 births
1886 deaths
People from Shipley, West Yorkshire
Settlers of Melbourne
19th-century Australian businesspeople